The Oreasteridae are a family of sea stars in the class Asteroidea.

Description and characteristics 
This family contains many species of regular starfishes with usually 5 arms around a stiff, convex and often brightly colored body. Whereas some species are very easy to identify, like the "pincushion seastars" (Culcita sp.), some other can be difficult to tell apart.

Selected genera
 List source :

 genus Acheronaster H.E.S. Clark, 1982 -- 1 species
 genus Anthaster Döderlein, 1915 -- 1 species
 genus Anthenea Gray, 1840 -- 22 species
 genus Astrosarkus Mah, 2003 -- 1 species
 genus Bothriaster Döderlein, 1916 -- 1 species
 genus Choriaster Lutken, 1869 -- 1 species
 genus Culcita Agassiz, 1836 -- 3 species
 genus Goniodiscaster H.L. Clark, 1909 -- 14 species
 genus Gymnanthenea H.L. Clark, 1938 -- 2 species
 genus Halityle Fisher, 1913 -- 1 species
 genus Monachaster Döderlein, 1916 -- 1 species
 genus Nectriaster H.L. Clark, 1946 -- 1 species
 genus Nidorellia Gray, 1840 -- 1 species
 genus Oreaster Müller & Troschel, 1842 -- 2 species
 genus Pentaceraster Döderlein, 1916 -- 14 species
 genus Pentaster Döderlein, 1935 -- 2 species
 genus Poraster Döderlein, 1916 -- 1 species
 genus Protoreaster Döderlein, 1916 -- 3 species
 genus Pseudanthenea Döderlein, 1915 -- 1 species
 genus Pseudoreaster Verrill, 1899 -- 1 species

References

External links
 .

 
Echinoderm families